Principia is a genus of alga that has been placed in the coralline stem group on the basis of its slightly differentiated thallus; it forms an "intermediate" between Hortonella, Neoprincipia and Archaeolithophyllum.

Fossil algae